Homole may refer to:

Czech Republic
Homole (České Budějovice District), a municipality and village in the South Bohemian Region
Homole, former name of Homole u Panny, a municipality and village in the Ústí nad Labem Region
Homole, a village and part of Borovnice (Rychnov nad Kněžnou District) in the Hradec Králové Region, a pilgrimage site
Homole, a village and part of Drhovy in the Central Bohemian Region

Greece
Homolium or Homole, a town of ancient Thessaly

Poland
Homole, a castle in Lower Silesian Voivodeship